The Gargoyles are two mountain peaks in the Garibaldi Ranges of the Pacific Ranges in southwestern British Columbia, Canada. A deeply eroded obsidian dome remnant at The Gargoyles contains 77% silica content and is the only Quaternary high-silica rhyolite identified anywhere in the Cascade Volcanic Arc north of the Three Sisters. The age of this rhyolite is poorly known.

The Gargoyles were originally mapped as the Lava Peaks by William Henry Mathews in 1958. The current name was suggested and adopted in 1978. Another name applied to The Gargoyles is Lava Peak.

References

External links

Garibaldi Ranges
New Westminster Land District
One-thousanders of British Columbia
Lava domes
Volcanoes of British Columbia